The Planters Pat Bradley International was a golf tournament on the LPGA Tour from 1981 to 1990. It was played at Willow Creek Country Club in High Point, North Carolina.

Winners
Planters Pat Bradley International
1990 Cindy Rarick
1989 Robin Hood
1988 Martha Nause

Henredon Classic
1987 Mary Beth Zimmerman
1986 Betsy King
1985 Nancy Lopez
1984 Patty Sheehan
1983 Patty Sheehan
1982 JoAnne Carner
1981 Sandra Haynie

References

External links
Willow Creek Golf Club - now High Point Country Club

Former LPGA Tour events
Golf in North Carolina
Women's sports in North Carolina